American singer Ciara has released seven studio albums, one extended play, one DVD, one promotional single, 49 singles (which includes twelve as a featured artist) and 28 music videos, including seven as a featured artist. She made her debut in 2004 with her debut album Goodies which debuted at three in the US and charted within the top 40 in several international markets. The album's title track peaked at number-one in the United States for seven weeks and gave the singer the title of "The First Lady of Crunk&B", while singles "1, 2 Step" and "Oh" reached the top three in the US. All three singles reached the top 10 in many international markets, with "Goodies" topping charts in the UK. Goodies was certified triple-Platinum in the United States, Platinum in Canada, and sold over five million copies worldwide. Ciara also participated in a number of successful collaborations, including US top five hits "Lose Control" with Missy Elliott, and "Like You" with rapper Bow Wow, as well as the US top 10 "So What" with group Field Mob.

Two years later in 2006, Ciara returned with her second album, Ciara: The Evolution. Having the similar success that Goodies had, Ciara: The Evolution debuted at number one on the Billboard 200, and charted in the top 30 of several international markets, reaching Platinum status in the US. The international lead single, "Get Up", reached the top 10 in the US and charted in international markets, while the US lead single, "Promise", topped the US R&B charts, and became her first top 20 hit in the US without a featured act. "Like a Boy" reached the top 20 in the US and many other international markets. During this time, Ciara took part as a featured artist in two songs, "Promise Ring" by Tiffany Evans and "Stepped on My J'z" by Nelly. In mid-2008, she was a part of Stand Up to Cancer's charity campaign and appeared on the single "Just Stand Up!"

In May 2009, Ciara returned with her third album, Fantasy Ride. While sticking to her R&B and hip-hop sound, the album had a new pop and dance sound, as well as soul influences. Although the album debuted in the top 10 of the US, Ireland, and the United Kingdom, it was notably less successful compared to Ciara's previous albums, only selling 193,000 copies in the US in a year. One single from the album, "Love Sex Magic", however, was a worldwide top 10 hit. The album also spawned the top 10 US R&B hit "Never Ever", as well as the international single, "Work", which achieved moderate success. Also in 2009, Ciara collaborated with Spanish singer Enrique Iglesias on the international top ten hit, "Takin' Back My Love". Ciara's fourth studio album, Basic Instinct, was released on December 10, 2010. It saw the singer returning to her urban roots. The album's lead single, "Ride", was a top three hit on the US R&B/Hip-Hop chart.

Ciara's fifth album, Ciara was released on July 5, 2013 and reached No.2 on the US Billboard 200. Its lead single, "Body Party", peaked at number 22 on the Billboard Hot 100 and number six on the Billboard R&B/Hip Hop chart, making it her thirteenth Top 10 hit and thirteenth Top 40 hit, respectively. It was also preceded by the single "I'm Out", featuring Nicki Minaj, which reached No. 44 on the Billboard Hot 100. 

Prior to the release of her third studio album, Ciara sold over seven million albums worldwide, and as of June 2010, she had sold more than 4.3 million albums and 6.9 million digital tracks in the US alone. As of 2019, Ciara's worldwide sales total 45 million, including "23 million records and 22 million singles".

Albums

Studio albums

Compilation albums

Singles

As lead artist

As featured artist

Promotional singles

Other charted songs

Guest appearances

Notes

References

External links 
 
 

Discography
Pop music discographies
Rhythm and blues discographies
Discographies of American artists